Women were able to be members in the Parliament of Afghanistan from the United States invasion of Afghanistan until the Fall of Kabul in 2021. Since then those who were elected have gone into hiding, many fleeing the country entirely. Many of them were recognised as part of the BBC's 100 Women in 2021.

History 
There were 69 elected in the 2018 parliamentary election, but most of them currently reside in Greece as refugees. They live in Athens in exile.

List 

 Elay Ershad
 Fawzia Koofi
 Farzana Kochai
 Mursal Nabizada

References 

Members of the National Assembly (Afghanistan)
Women in Afghanistan
21st-century Afghan women politicians
21st-century Afghan politicians
2021 in women's history